
FORMAC, the FORmula MAnipulation Compiler, was the first computer algebra system to have significant use. It was developed by Jean E. Sammet and her team, as an extension of FORTRAN IV. The compiler was implemented as a preprocessor taking the FORMAC program and converting it to a FORTRAN IV program which was in turn compiled without further user intervention. 

Initial development started in 1962 and was complete by April 1964. In November it was released to IBM customers.

FORMAC supported computation, manipulation, and use of symbolic expressions. In addition it supported rational arithmetic.

See also 
 ALTRAN

References

Bibliography

External links

Computer algebra systems
Fortran programming language family
Procedural programming languages
Programming languages created in 1962
Programming languages created by women